Framber Valdez (born November 19, 1993) is a Dominican professional baseball pitcher for the Houston Astros of Major League Baseball (MLB). Valdez signed with the Astros as an international free agent in 2015, and made his MLB debut in 2018.

In 2022, Valdez became the Astros' Opening Day starter, an MLB All-Star, and an All-MLB First Team selection, each for the first time, while compiling an MLB record of 25 consecutive in-season quality starts.  The Astros won that year's World Series, the first championship for Valdez.

Early life
Framber Valdez was born in Palenque, San Cristóbal Province, Dominican Republic. He started pitching at age 16.

Career

Minor leagues
Valdez signed with the Houston Astros as an international free agent on March 19, 2015, for a $10,000 bonus. At age 21, he was five years older than most amateur free agent signings from his country. Two Astros scouts spotted him after a long day of viewing programs led by independent trainers. Watching him throw only six pitches, they offered him a tryout at their Dominican academy near Guayacanes.

Valdez made his professional debut in 2015 with the DSL Astros, going 4–1 with a 3.68 ERA over  innings. He split the 2016 season between the Greeneville Astros, Tri City ValleyCats, Quad Cities River Bandits, and Lancaster JetHawks, combining to go 4–5 with a 3.19 ERA over  innings. He split the 2017 season between the Buies Creek Astros and the Corpus Christi Hooks, going a combined 7–8 with a 4.16 ERA over  innings. Following the 2017 season, he played for the Mesa Solar Sox of the Arizona Fall League.

He split the 2018 minor league season between Corpus Christi and the Fresno Grizzlies, going a combined 6–5 with a 4.11 ERA over 103 innings.

Houston Astros

Rookie season (2018)
The Astros promoted Valdez to the major leagues for the first time on August 21, 2018. He made his debut that day, pitching  innings and earning the win. With Houston in 2018, he went 4–1 with a 2.19 ERA over 37 innings.

2019
Valdez split the 2019 season between the Round Rock Express and Houston.  With Round Rock, he went 5–2 with a 3.25 ERA over  innings.  With Houston, he went 4–7 with a 5.86 ERA over  innings.

2020
In 2020, Valdez was 5–3 with a 3.57 ERA in 11 games (10 starts), in which he threw  innings and struck out 76 batters (8th in the AL), and had the second-best home runs per nine innings allowed (HR/9 IP) ratio in the AL (0.637).  He led the club in innings pitched, tied for the team lead in games won, and was named Astros Pitcher of the Year by the Houston chapter of the Baseball Writers' Association of America (BBWAA).

On September 29, 2020, Valdez became the first relief pitcher to throw five scoreless innings in the playoffs since Madison Bumgarner did so in Game 7 in the 2014 World Series.  Valdez has had great success in the playoffs and took his team into the ALCS and almost led them to the World Series.

2021
On March 3, 2021, Valdez suffered a fractured left ring finger after he was hit in the hand by a Francisco Lindor ground ball in a spring training game. Expected to miss months or possibly the whole season, he returned on May 28.  He led the major leagues in ground ball rate in 2021.

In 2021, Valdez was 11–6 with one complete game and a 3.14 ERA over 22 starts and  innings.

Valdez started Game 5 of the American League Championship Series (ALCS) versus the Boston Red Sox at Fenway Park.  He went eight innings to earn the win in a 9–1 final, limiting Boston to one run on three hits and a walk while striking out five. At several points during the game, Red Sox radio announcers Joe Castiglione and Will Flemming commented that Valdez was rubbing the fingers of his pitching hand against his cheek and temple each time he was given a new ball, which prompted an angry response from Houston sportswriters; no accusation of cheating was filed by the Red Sox.

Valdez was the seventh visiting pitcher at Fenway to go at least eight innings in a postseason game while allowing a run or fewer, and the first since Charles Nagy in 1998.

2022
Valdez avoided arbitration with the Astros on March 22, 2022, agreeing on a $3 million contract for the season.

On April 7, 2022, Valdez won his debut as an Opening Day starting pitcher, opposite Los Angeles Angels two-way star Shohei Ohtani, recording  scoreless innings in a 3–1 final.  Valdez, relying on his sinker in 50 percent of pitches thrown that night, got nine total ground ball outs and also retired 15 consecutive batters.  In a season in which he reached many career-best figures, Valdez hurled 25 straight quality starts from April 25—September 18, establishing the MLB record for most consecutive over a single season.  It also set the record for most consecutive total in American League history and among left-handed pitchers, trailing only Bob Gibson and Jacob deGrom (tied at 26) for most consecutive all-time. 

Valdez tied his season-high with seven strikeouts over seven innings versus the Texas Rangers on May 19, allowing one run on six hits to lead a 5–1 win.  He achieved his first nine-inning complete game on May 30 versus the Athletics at Oakland Coliseum, a two-hitter and 5–1 Astros win.  On July 3, Valdez reached a new career-high 13 strikeouts, among five walks in six innings in a start versus the Angels.  Twelve consecutive outs Valdez produced were via strikeout, supplanting the franchise record of nine previously accomplished by Don Wilson, Randy Johnson, and Gerrit Cole (twice).  Valdez' 13 were the first of 20 Astros strikeouts, establishing a franchise record for a nine-inning game.

Valdez was named to the MLB All-Star Game at Dodger Stadium, his first career selection.  His 2.64 ERA ranked second on the Astros' staff and he also had pitched two complete games, tying for the major league lead. He pitched in the third inning of the All-Star Game, retiring all three batters faced, and received the win when the American League scored the go-ahead run after he had finished.  Valdez became the first in Astros history to receive the win in an All-Star Game, and the first to receive any kind of decision since Roger Clemens in 2004.

On August 24, Valdez reached 21 consecutive quality starts with one run allowed over seven innings versus the Minnesota Twins, passing Mike Scott's club record established in 1986.  Valdez became the fifth pitcher since 2000 to accomplish twenty in a row.  On September 12, he threw his first major league complete-game shutout, a 7–0 win over the Detroit Tigers.  Through September 14, 2022, Valdez had induced the highest career ground ball rate (66.3%) of any pitcher since 1988, and only Derek Lowe had surpassed that figure in any individual season (2002 and 2006).

For the 2022 regular season, Valdez produced a 2.82 ERA and 17–6 record over 31 games started.  He led the AL in innings pitched, batters faced (827), complete games (3), shutouts (1), quality starts (26), and HR/9 IP (0.492), all of which were career-bests to that point.  His win total placed second in the AL behind rotation-mate Justin Verlander, while his ERA was sixth, and 194 strikeouts were seventh, tied with Cristian Javier for the team lead.  Valdez threw sinkers 49% of the time, the highest percentage in major league baseball, and his 83 mph cutter was the slowest among major league pitchers.

As starter of Game 2 of the 2022 World Series, Valdez struck out nine Philadelphia Phillies batters over  innings to earn his first career win in World Series play following a 5–2 Astros victory.   Valdez started and became the winning pitcher in the Astros' Game 6 Series clincher, working six innings while allowing one run on two hits and striking out nine to give him his first career championship.  During the 2022 postseason, he was 4–0 with a 1.61 ERA and .144 batting average against.

2023
Valdez agreed to a $6.8 million contract for the season with the Astros on January 13, 2023, avoiding arbitration.  A $3.8 million raise, it was the largest to date for pitcher advancing from year 1 to 2 of arbitration who had yet to win a Cy Young Award. \

Personal life
Valdez is married with two children.

During Game 2 of the 2022 World Series at Minute Maid Park, Valdez' father, José Antonio Valdéz Ramírez, witnessed his son pitch for the first time in the major leagues.  Valdez had not traveled previously to see him play due to a fear of flying.

Valdez is a Christian. He donated $100,000 to help build a church in his hometown.

See also

 Houston Astros award winners and league leaders
 List of Major League Baseball annual shutout leaders
 List of Major League Baseball players from the Dominican Republic
 List of World Series starting pitchers

References
Footnotes

Sources

External links

1993 births
Living people
People from San Cristóbal Province
Dominican Republic expatriate baseball players in the United States
Major League Baseball players from the Dominican Republic
Major League Baseball pitchers
Houston Astros players
American League All-Stars
Dominican Summer League Astros players
Tri-City ValleyCats players
Quad Cities River Bandits players
Lancaster JetHawks players
Buies Creek Astros players
Corpus Christi Hooks players
Mesa Solar Sox players
Fresno Grizzlies players
Águilas Cibaeñas players
Round Rock Express players
Sugar Land Skeeters players